The national security and intelligence advisor is a public servant who advises the prime minister of Canada on security and intelligence matters. The position is supported by the Security and Intelligence Secretariat and the Intelligence Assessment Staff and holds the rank of associate secretary in the Privy Council Office (PCO).

Responsibilities
The National Security and Intelligence Advisor has four main responsibilities:
providing information, advice and recommendations on security and intelligence policy matters to the prime minister;
co-ordinating members of the security and intelligence community;
along with the deputy minister for the Department of National Defence, is accountable to the minister of national defence for the Communications Security Establishment; and
overseeing the intelligence assessment function, specifically the production and co-ordination of intelligence assessments for the prime minister, other Cabinet members and senior government officials.

History 
The position was created in 2005 by Deputy Prime Minister Anne McLellan and had been tasked by Prime Minister Paul Martin to reorganize of Canada's national security scheme. She released a policy document called Securing an Open Society: Canada's National Security Policy.

Daniel Jean resigned after he suggested that Justin Trudeau's trip to India was sabotaged.

On November 8, 2019, Greta Bossenmaier retired from the Public Service of Canada. Foreign and Defence Policy Advisor David Morrison acted in the role while the Prime Minister's Office sought a permanent replacement.

On January 22, 2020, Vince Rigby took up the post, which had been filled in the interim since Bossenmaier's departure by David Morrison

Former National Defence Deputy Minister Jody Thomas took over the role on January 11, 2022.

List of National Security Advisors

References

Privy Council Office (2009). . Retrieved February 20, 2009.
Privy Council Office (2005). Organization Chart. Retrieved July 8, 2005.

External links
Privy Council Office: Securing an Open Society: Canada’s National Security Policy.
Privy Council Office: [http://www.pco-bcp.gc.ca/default.asp?Page=Publications&Language=E&doc=Role/role_e.htm#DSSI  The Structure of the Privy Council Office:
 [https://www.canada.ca/en/privy-council/corporate/organizational-structure.html
Canada School of Public Service: National Security Advisor's role in Canada-US Government Collaboration

Federal departments and agencies of Canada